Ripp tha Game Bloody: Street Muzic is the third studio album by American rapper RBX, released January 27, 2004 on Gangsta Advisory Records and Premeditated Entertainment. The album features guest performances by several West Coast heavy-weights, including: Snoop Dogg, Soopafly, Kokane and Daz Dillinger. The last two songs are hidden bonus tracks. Also there is a deluxe edition of this album that include 23 tracks, the 19 tracks from the album + the hidden tracks + 2 new tracks.

Track listing

External links 
 [ Ripp Tha Game Bloody (Street Muzic)] at Allmusic
 Ripp Tha Game Bloody (Street Muzic) at Discogs
 Ripp Tha Game Bloody (Street Muzic) at Tower Records

RBX albums
2004 albums
Gangsta rap albums by American artists
G-funk albums